HD 19789 is a double star in the northern constellation of Aries. The primary component has an orange hue and is barely visible to the naked eye with an apparent visual magnitude of 6.11. it is located at a distance of approximately 390 light years from the Sun based on parallax, and is drifting further away with a radial velocity of +8 km/s. The star is located near the ecliptic and thus is subject to lunar occultations.

The primary, designated component A, is an aging giant star with a stellar classification of K0IIIp, where the 'p' suffix indicates some type of unspecified peculiarity in the spectrum. It has exhausted the supply of hydrogen at its core, then expanded and cooled off the main sequence: at present it has 11 times the girth of the Sun. The star is radiating 58.5 times the Sun's luminosity from its swollen photosphere at an effective temperature of 4822 K. It has one reported companion, component B, at an angular separation of  along a position angle of 23°, as of 1982.

References

K-type giants
Double stars
Aries (constellation)
Durchmusterung objects
019789
014821
0952